Little London may refer to the following places:

United Kingdom
Little London, Brill, Buckinghamshire
Little London, Oakley, Bucks
*Little London, East Sussex
*Little London, Gloucestershire
Little London, Andover, Hampshire
Little London, Tadley, Hampshire
*Little London, Spalding, Lincolnshire
Little London, Stallingborough, Lincolnshire
*Little London, Shropshire
Little London, Somerset, a part of Oakhill
Little London, Suffolk
Little London, Albury, Surrey
Little London, Wendover, Buckinghamshire
*Little London, Leeds, West Yorkshire
Little London, West Yorkshire, split between Rawdon, Leeds, and Idle and Thackley, Bradford

Other countries
*Little London, Jamaica
Londrina ("Londoner" or "Little London"), Paraná, Brazil, named for British entrepreneurs who initiated the settlement
Mali London ("Little London"), a settlement in Pančevo, Serbia
Londynek (pl. Little London), district in Bydgoszcz, Poland around Pomorska Street, Bydgoszcz

As a nickname
Gothenburg, Sweden
Colorado Springs, Colorado
Balaklava, Sevastopol, Crimea
Hingham, Norfolk, England
Quetta, Pakistan